AMI Stadium may refer to:
Lancaster Park or Jade Stadium, a sports stadium damaged in the 2011 Christchurch earthquake, demolished in 2018
Rugby League Park or Christchurch Stadium, a rugby football stadium also in Christchurch, New Zealand